N. Bronwen Manby  is a British human rights scholar and lobbyist specialized in comparative nationality law, statelessness, and legal identity in Africa. She is an independent consultant and a senior policy fellow and guest lecturer at the MSc in human rights in the London School of Economics. Manby was previously the deputy director of the African branch of the Human Rights Watch.

Life 
Manby completed degrees at the University of Oxford and Columbia University. She is a qualified solicitor in England and Wales. Her work focuses on human rights in Africa with a focus on comparative nationality law, statelessness, and legal identities.

On October 20, 2015, Manby graduated with a Ph.D. from Maastricht University's Faculty of Law. Her dissertation, Citizenship and statelessness in Africa: the law and politics of belonging, was conducted under supervisor Gerard-René de Groot and co-supervisor Olivier Vonk.

Manby was awarded Order of the British Empire in 2004.

Manby was deputy director of the African branch of the Human Rights Watch. She later became a senior advisor for Africa Govern. Manby is a senior policy fellow and guest lecturer at the MSc in human rights at the London School of Economics.

Selected works

References

External links
 

British human rights activists
British women activists
21st-century British women writers
British lobbyists
Alumni of the University of Oxford
Columbia University alumni
Maastricht University alumni
Members of the Order of the British Empire
Living people
Year of birth missing (living people)
Place of birth missing (living people)
Human Rights Watch people